The men's shot put event at the 2019 African Games was held on 27 August in Rabat.

Results

References

Shot
African Games